The Nathaniel Drake House is located at 602 West Front Street in the city of Plainfield in Union County, New Jersey. The house was built in 1746 and was added to the National Register of Historic Places on June 19, 1973, for its significance in architecture. It now operated as the Drake House Museum and is the headquarters of the Historical Society of Plainfield, though the building is owned by the City of Plainfield.  The most famous piece in the Society's collection is the painting, "The Death of General Sedgwick" by Julian Scott.

History
Issac Drake built the home in 1746 for his son Nathaniel Drake on the Old York Road. The original home was a -story building with four rooms and a lean-to kitchen. George Washington stayed at the home during the Battle of Short Hills in 1777. John S. Harberger purchased the home in 1864 and remodeled the building. Harberger's additions to the building included a mansard roof, ballroom, a 3-story tower in the rear of the building and a turret on the side of the home.

See also 
 National Register of Historic Places listings in Union County, New Jersey
 List of the oldest buildings in New Jersey
 List of museums in New Jersey
 List of Washington's Headquarters during the Revolutionary War

References

External links
 Drake House Museum
 The Battle of Short Hills

Houses on the National Register of Historic Places in New Jersey
Gothic Revival architecture in New Jersey
Houses completed in 1746
Houses in Union County, New Jersey
Museums in Union County, New Jersey
Historic house museums in New Jersey
National Register of Historic Places in Union County, New Jersey
Plainfield, New Jersey
New Jersey Register of Historic Places